Clive Matthew-Wilson (born 24 July 1956 in Wellington) is a New Zealand writer.

He was educated at exclusive private school Scots College, and Wellington College. Matthew-Wilson left school at 15. After several years traveling, he became a motor mechanic. He ended up running his own garage for six years, before experimenting with a number of careers, including prestidigitation, advertising, songwriting, jewellery, computers, publishing and public relations. He eventually became a professional writer, whose published works include The Information Effect, The Turners & Growers Natural Foods Cookbook & The Dog & Lemon Guide. Matthew-Wilson is concerned about fatal police chases.

References

1956 births
Living people
New Zealand writers
People from Wellington City
People educated at Scots College, Wellington
People educated at Wellington College (New Zealand)